Dylan Lyons (March 1998 – February 22, 2023) was an American television news reporter for Spectrum News 13 in Orlando, Florida. He was fatally shot while reporting from the scene of a homicide in the Pine Hills neighborhood.

Early life and career
A graduate of the University of Central Florida with degrees in journalism and political science, Lyons reported and anchored for the UCF Knightly News. He reported and anchored for WCJB, an ABC affiliate in Gainesville.

Killing
On February 22, 2023, Lyons was part of a news crew reporting from Pine Hills in Orange County on the fatal shooting of Nathacha Augustin that had happened earlier in the day. Keith Melvin Moses, the suspect in the prior shooting, returned to the crime scene and shot Lyons and Spectrum News photographer Jesse Walden, then went to a nearby home and shot Brandi Major and her 9-year-old daughter, T'Yonna Major.  Police later arrested Moses, who had been an acquaintance of Augustin. Lyons and T'Yonna Major died, while Brandi Major and Walden were critically injured but survived. Moses had a criminal record dating back to 2018 but was never imprisoned as he was a minor at the time.

In addition to his immediate family, Lyons left behind a fiancé, Casey Lynn. A GoFundMe page was set up by the Orlando community and Dylan's sister Rachel to cover the funeral expenses of Lyons and Major.

References

Deaths by firearm in Florida
February 2023 crimes in the United States
Murdered American journalists
People from Orlando, Florida
University of Central Florida alumni